Don Chan may refer to:

 Don Chan Palace, hotel in Vientiane, Laos
 Don Chan District in Kalasin Province, Thailand
 Don Chan 2 Slot, Java applet video game
 Don Chan Puzzle: Hanabi de Don!, Japanese video game created by Takumi Corporation and Aruze
 Don-chan, a character from Mahōtsukai Chappy
 Don-chan, a living taiko drum from the video game series Taiko No Tatsujin.